

A–H 

To find entries for A–H, use the table of contents above.

I 

 I.A.Abbott – Isabella Aiona Abbott (1919–2010)
 I.A.Pilát – Ignatz Anton Pilát (1820–1870)
 I.Baker – Irene Baker (1918–1989)
 I.Barua – Iswar Chandra Barua (born 1960)
 I.Bjørnstadt (also Nordal) – Inger Nordal (born 1944)
 Ickert-Bond – Stefanie M. Ickert-Bond (fl. 2001–2013)
 I.C.Martind. – Isaac Comly Martindale (1842–1893)
 I.C.Nielsen – Ivan Christian Nielsen (1946–2007)
 Ida – Reijiro Ida (fl. 1969)
 I.Deg. – Isa Degener (1924–2018)
 I.D.Illar. – Irina D. Illarionova (fl. 2008)
 Ietsw. – Jaan H. Ietswaart (born 1940)
 I.F.Lewis – Ivey Foreman Lewis (1882–1964)
 I.G.Stone – Ilma Grace Stone (1913–2001)
 I.Gut. – Rosa Ivonne Gutiérrez-Sánchez (fl. 2018)
 I.Hagen – Ingebrigt Severin Hagen (1852–1917)
 I.I.Abramov – Ivan Ivanovich Abramov (1912–1990)
 Iinuma – Yokusai Iinuma (1782–1865)
 I.Keller – Ida Augusta Keller (1866–1932)
 Ik.Takah. – Ikuro Takahashi (1892–1981)
 Iliff – James Iliff (1923–2014)
 Iljin – Modest Mikhaĭlovich Iljin (1889–1967)
 Iljinsk. – Irina Alekseevna Iljinskaja (1921–2011)
 I.Löw – Immanuel Löw (1854–1944)
 Iltis – Hugh Hellmut Iltis (1925–2016)
 Imbach – Emil J. Imbach (1897–1970)
 I.M.Haring – Inez M. Haring (1875–1968)
 I.M.Johnst. – Ivan Murray Johnston (1898–1960)
 Immelman – Kathleen Leonore Immelman (born 1955)
 I.M.Oliv. – Inge Magdalene Oliver (1947–2003)
 I.M.Turner – Ian Mark Turner (born 1963)
 Incarv. – Pierre Nicolas le Chéron (d')Incarville (1706–1757)
 Ingold – Cecil Terence Ingold (1905–2010)
 Ingram – Collingwood Ingram (1880–1981)
 Inocencio –  (born 1969)
 Inoue – Inoue Hiroshi (1932–1989)
 I.O.Cook – Ian O. Cook (fl. 1991)
 I.Oliv. – Ian Oliver (born 1954)
 I.Pop – Ioan Pop (born 1922)
 I.Rácz – István Rácz (born 1952)
 Irmsch. – Edgar Irmscher (1887–1968)
 Irwin – James Bruce Irwin (born 1921)
 Isaac – Frances Margaret Leighton (later Isaac) (1909–2006) (F.M.Leight. is also used)
 I.Sastre – Ines Sastre (born 1955)
 Isawumi – Moses A. Isawumi (fl. 1995)
 I.S.Chen – Ih Sheng Chen (fl. 1972)
 Isely – Duane Isely (1918–2000)
 I.Sinclair – Isabella Sinclair (1842–1900)
 Ising – Ernest Horace Ising (1884–1973)
 I.S.Nelson – Ira Schreiber Nelson (1911–1965)
 I.Sprague – Isaac Sprague (1811–1895)
 I.Telford – Ian R.H. Telford (born 1941)
 I.Thomps. – Ian R. Thompson (fl. 1996)
 Ito – Keisuke Ito (1803–1901)
 I.Verd. – Inez Clare Verdoorn (1896–1989)
 Iversen – Johannes Iversen (1904–1972)
 Ives – Joseph Christmas Ives (1828–1868)
 I.W.Bailey – Irving Widmer Bailey (1884–1967)
 I.W.Hutchison – Isobel Wylie Hutchison (1889–1982)
 I.Williams – Ion James Muirhead Williams (1912–2001)

J 

 J.A.Armstr. – James Andrew Armstrong (born 1950)
 Jaaska – Vello Jaaska (born 1936)
 Jabbour – Florian Jabbour (fl. 2011)
 Jack – William Jack (1795–1822)
 Jackes – Betsy Rivers Jackes (born 1935)
 Jacks. – George Jackson (1780–1811)
 J.A.Clark – Josephine Adelaide Clark (1856–1929)
 Jac.M.Burke – Jacinta Marie Burke (fl. 2006)
 Jacobi  –  (1805–1874)
 Jacobs – Maxwell Ralph Jacobs (1905–1979)
 Jacobsen – Hans Jacobsen (1815–1891)
 Jacobsson – Stig Jacobsson (born 1938)
 Jacq. – Nikolaus Joseph von Jacquin (1727–1817)
 Jacq.-Fél. –  (born 1907)
 Jacquem. – Venceslas Victor Jacquemont (1801–1832)
 Jacques – Henri Antoine Jacques (1782–1866)
 Jacquinot – Honoré Jacquinot (1814–1887)
 Jaderh. – Axel Elof Jaderholm (1868–1927)
 Jafri – Saiyad Masudal Hasan Jafri (1927–1986)
 J.Agardh – Jacob Georg Agardh (1813–1901)
 J.A.Guim. –  (1862–1922)
 Jakubz. – Moisej Markovič Jakubziner (born 1898)
 Jalal – Jeewan Singh Jalal (born 1979)
 Jalas – Arvo Jaakko Juhani Jalas (1920–1999)
 Jalink – Leonardo Martinus Jalink (born 1956)
 J.Allam. – Jean-Nicolas-Sébastien Allamand (1713 or 1716–1787 or 1793)
 J.A.Martind. – Joseph Anthony Martindale (1837–1914)
 J.A.McDonald – John Andrew McDonald (fl. 1982–200)
 James – Thomas Potts James (1803–1882)
 Jameson – William Jameson (1796–1873)
 J.A.Muir – John A. Muir (fl. 1973)
 Janch. – Erwin Emil Alfred Janchen (1882–1970)
 Jancz. – Edward Janczewski (1846–1918)
 J.Anderson – James Anderson (fl. 1868)
 J.Andrews – J. Andrews (fl. 1952)
 Janes – Jasmine K. Janes (fl. 2010)
 Janisch. –  (1875–1944)
 Janka – Victor von Janka (1837–1900)
 Janse – Johannes Albertus Janse (1911–1977)
 J.Anthony – John Anthony (1891–1972)
 J.A.Palmer – Julius Auboineau Palmer (1840–1899)
 Jarman – S. Jean Jarman
 J.A.Schmidt – Johann Anton Schmidt (1823–1905)
 Játiva –  (fl. 1963)
 Jaub. – Hippolyte François Jaubert (1798–1874)
 Jáv. – Sándor (Alexander) Jávorka (1883–1961)
 J.Bauhin – Johann Bauhin (1541–1613)
 J.B.Beck – James B. Beck (fl. 2010)
 J.B.Comber – James Boughtwood Comber (1929–2005)
 J.B.Fisch. – Johann Baptist Fischer (1803–1832)
 J.B.Kirkp. – James Barrie Kirkpatrick (born 1946)
 J.B.Mackay – John Bain Mackay (1795–1888)
 J.B.Nelson – John B. Nelson (born 1951)
 J.B.Petersen – Johannes Boye Petersen (1887–1961)
 J.B.Phipps – James Bird Phipps (born 1934)
 J.Bradbury – John Bradbury (1768–1823)
 J.Breitenb. – Josef Breitenbach (1927–1998)
 J.B.Rohr – Julius Bernard von Röhr (1686–1742)
 J.B.Sinclair – James Burton Sinclair (born 1927)
 J.Buchholz – John Theodore Buchholz (1888–1951)
 J.B.Williams – John Beaumont Williams (1932–2005)
 J.Carey – John Carey (1797–1880)
 J.C.Clausen – Jens Christen (Christian) Clausen (1891–1969)
 J.C.F.Hopkins – John Collier Frederick Hopkins (1898–1981)
 J.C.Fisch. – Johann Carl Fischer (1804–1885)
 J.C.Gomes – José Corrêa Gomes, Jr. (1919–1965)
 J.C.Hickman – James Craig Hickman (1941–1993)
 J.Clayton – John Clayton (1694–1773)
 J.C.Manning – John Charles Manning (born 1962)
 J.C.Martínez – J. Carlos Martínez Macchiavello (born 1931)
 J.C.Mikan – Johann Christian Mikan (1769–1844)
 J.C.Nelson – James Carlton Nelson (1867–1944)
 J.Commelijn – Jan Commelin (also known by Jan Commelijn or Johannes Commelinus) (1629–1692)
 J.Compton – James A. Compton (born 1953)
 J.C.Parks – James C. Parks (1942–2002) 
 J.C.Prag. – Jan C. Prager (born 1934)
 J.C.Ross – James Clark Ross (1800–1862)
 J.C.Siqueira – Josafá Carlos de Siqueira (born 1953)
 J.C.Sowerby – James de Carle Sowerby (1787–1871)
 J.C.Vogel – Johannes Vogel (born 1963)
 J.C.Wendl. – Johann Christoph Wendland (1755–1828)
 J.D.Arm. – James D. Armitage (fl. 2011)
 J.D.Bacon – John Dudley Bacon (born 1943)
 J.D.Briggs – John D. Briggs (born 1954)
 J.D.Mitch. – John D. Mitchell (fl. 1993)
 J.Dransf. – John Dransfield (born 1945)
 J.D.Ray – James Davis Ray Jr. (1918–1990)
 J.Drumm. – James Drummond (1784–1863)
 J.D.Sauer – Jonathan Deininger Sauer (1918–2008)
 J.D.Schultze – Johannes Dominik Schultze (1752–1790)
 J.Duan – Jun Duan (fl. 2010)
 J.E.Alexander – James Edward Alexander (1803–1885)
 Jeanes – Jeffrey A. Jeanes (fl. 2000)
 Jean White – Jean White-Haney (1877–1953)
 Jebb – Matthew H. P. Jebb (born 1958)
 J.E.Br. – John Ednie Brown (1848–1899)
 Jefferies – R.L. Jefferies (fl. 1987)
 Jeffrey –  (1866–1943)
 J.E.Gray – John Edward Gray (1800–1875)
 Jekyll – Gertrude Jekyll (1843–1932)
 J.E.Lange – Jakob Emanuel Lange (1864–1941) (father of Knud Morten Lange)
 J.Ellis – John Ellis (1710–1776)
 J.E.Palmér – Johan Ernst Palmér (1863–1946)
 J.E.Pohl – Johann Ehrenfried Pohl (1746–1800)
 Jeps. – Willis Linn Jepson (1867–1946)
 J.E.Sowerby – John Edward Sowerby (1825–1870)
 Jess. – Karl Friedrich Wilhelm Jessen (1821–1889)
 Jessop – John Peter Jessop (born 1939)
 Jessup – Laurence W. Jessup (born 1947)
 Jeuken – M. Jeuken (fl. 1952)
 J.Everett – Joy Everett (born 1953)
 J.E.Vidal – Jules Eugène Vidal (born 1914)
 J.E.Wright – Jorge Eduardo Wright (1922–2005)
 J.E.Zetterst. – Johan Emanuel Zetterstedt (1828–1880)
 J.Fabr. – Johan Christian Fabricius (1745–1808)
 J.F.Bailey – John Frederick Bailey (1866–1938)
 J.F.Clark – Judson Freeman Clark (1870–1942)
 J.F.Cowell – John Francis Cowell (1852–1915)
 J.F.Gmel. – Johann Friedrich Gmelin (1748–1804)
 J.Fisch. – Jacob Benjamin Fischer (1730–1793)
 J.-F.Leroy – Jean-François Leroy (1915–1999)
 J.Florence – Jacques Florence (born 1951)
 J.F.Macbr. – James Francis Macbride (1892–1976)
 J.F.Matthews – James F. Matthews (born 1935)
 J.F.Maxwell – James F. Maxwell (1949–2015)
 J.Forbes – James Forbes (1773–1861)
 J.Frost – John Frost (1803–1840)
 J.Gay – Jacques Etienne Gay (1786–1864)
 J.G.Cooper – James Graham Cooper (1830–1902)
 J.Gerard – John Gerard (1545–1612)
 J.Gerlach – Justin Gerlach (born 1970)
 J.G.Gmel. – Johann Georg Gmelin (1709–1755)
 J.G.Jack – John George Jack (1861–1949)
 J.G.Kühn – Julius Gotthelf Kühn (1825–1910)
 J.G.Nelson – John Gudgeon Nelson (1818–1882)
 J.Gröntved – Julius Gröntved (or Grøntved) (1899–1967)
 J.G.Sm. –  (1866–1957)
 J.G.West – Judith Gay West (born 1949)
 J.H.Adam – Jumaat Haji Adam (born 1956)
 J.H.Christ – John Henry ("Heinie") Christ (1896–1972)
 J.Harriman – John Harriman (1760–1831)
 J.H.Kirkbr. – Joseph Harold Kirkbride (born 1943)
 J.Hogg – John Hogg (1800–1869)
 J.Houz. – Jean Houzeau de Lehaie (1867–1959)
 J.H.Ross – James Henderson Ross (born 1941)
 J.H.Schaffn. – John Henry Schaffner (1866–1939)
 J.H.Wallace – John Hume Wallace (born 1918)
 J.H.Willis – James Hamlyn Willis (1910–1995)
 Jian W.Li – Jian Wu Li (fl. 2014)
 Jílek – Bohumil Jílek (1905–1972)
 J.Jacobsen – Jens Peter Jacobsen (1847–1885)
 J.J.Amann – Jean Jules Amann (1859–1939)
 J.J.Bruhl – Jeremy James Bruhl (born 1956)
 J.J.Engel – John Jay Engel (born 1941)
 J.Jiménez Alm. –  (1905–1982)
 J.J.Kickx – Jean Jacques Kickx (1842–1887)
 J.J.Scheuchzer – Johann Jacob Scheuchzer (1672–1733)
 J.J.Sm. – Johannes Jacobus Smith (1867–1947)
 J.Jundz. –  (1794–1877)
 J.Juss. – Joseph de Jussieu (1704–1779)
 J.J.Verm. – Jaap J. Vermeulen (born 1955)
 J.J.Wood – Jeffrey James Wood (born 1952)
 J.K.Bartlett – John Kenneth Bartlett (1945–1986)
 J.Kern – Johannes Hendrikus Kern (1903–1974)
 J.Kern. – Johann Simon von Kerner (1755–1830) 
 J.Kickx – Jean Kickx, Sr. (1775–1831)
 J.Kickx f. – Jean Kickx, Jr. (1803–1864)
 J.K.Morton – John Kenneth Morton (1928–2011)
 J.Koenig – Johann Gerhard Koenig (1728–1785)
 J.Kost. – Joséphine Thérèse Koster (1902–1986)
 J.K.Towns. – John Kirk Townsend (1809–1851)
 J.Lachm. – Johannes Lachmann (1832–1860)
 J.L.Clark – John Littner Clark (born 1969)
 J.Lee – James Lee (1715–1795)
 J.Léonard – Jean Joseph Gustave Léonard (born 1920)
 J.L.Gentry – Johnnie Lee Gentry (born 1939)
 J.Lowe – Josiah Lincoln Lowe (1905–1997)
 J.L.Palmer – Johann Ludwig Palmer (1784–1836)
 J.L.Parm. – Jean Louis Jacques Henri Parmentier (1777–1865)
 J.L.Porter – John L. Porter (born 1964)
 J.L.Schultz – Joanna L. Schultz (born 1963)
 J.Lundb. – Johannes Lundberg (fl. 2001)
 J.MacGill. – John MacGillivray (1822–1867)
 J.Mackay – James Townsend Mackay (1775–1862)
 J.Macrae – James Macrae (died 1830)
 J.Martyn – John Martyn (1699–1768)
 J.Mathew – Jose Mathew (born 1985)
 J.M.Bigelow – John Milton Bigelow (1804–1878)
 J.M.Black – John McConnell Black (1855–1951)
 J.M.Clarke – John Mason Clarke (1857–1925)
 J.M.Coult. – John Merle Coulter (1851–1928)
 J.M.C.Rich. – Jean Michel Claude Richard (1787–1868)
 J.M.H.Shaw – Julian Mark Hugh Shaw (born 1955)
 J.Milne – Josephine Milne (born 1957)
 J.M.Kain – Joanna M. Kain (1930–2017)
 J.M.MacDougal – John Mochrie MacDougal (born 1954)
 J.M.Macoun – James Melville Macoun (1862–1920)
 J.M.Muñoz – Jesús M. Muñoz (born 1955)
 J.Moll – Jan Willem Moll (1851–1933) 
 J.M.Powell – Jocelyn Marie Powell (born 1939)
 J.M.Schopf – James Morton Schopf (1911–1978)
 J.M.Taylor – Joan M. Taylor (born 1929)
 J.M.Tucker – John Maurice Tucker (1916–2008)
 J.Muir – John Muir (1838–1914)
 J.Muñoz – Jesús Muñoz (born 1964)
 J.Murata –  (born 1952)
 J.Murray – John Murray (1841–1914)
 J.M.Waller – James Martin Waller (born 1938)
 J.M.Ward – Josephine M. Ward (fl. 1997)
 J.M.Watson – John Michael Watson (born 1936) 
 J.M.Webber – John Milton Webber (1897–1984)
 J.M.Wood – John Medley Wood (1827–1915)
 Jn.Dalton – John Dalton (1766–1844)
 Jobson – Peter Craig Jobson (born 1965)
 Johan-Olsen (also Sopp) – Olav Johan Sopp (1860–1931)
 Johans. – Frits Johansen (1882–1957)
 Johanss. – Karl Johansson (1856–1928)
 John Muir – John Muir (1874–1947)
 John Parkinson – John Parkinson (1567–1650)
 Johnst. – George Johnston (1797–1855)
 Johow – Federico Johow (also as Friedrich Richard Adelbert (or Adelbart) Johow) (1859–1933)
 Jongkind – Carel Christiaan Hugo Jongkind (born 1954)
 Jonst. – John Jonston (also as Johannes Jonston or Joannes Jonstonus) (1603–1675)
 Jord. – Claude Thomas Alexis Jordan (1814–1897)
 Josekutty – Elayanithottathil Joseph Josekutty (fl. 2016)
 Joshi – Amar Chaud Joshi (1908–1971)
 Jos.Kern. – Josef Kerner (1829–1906)
 Jos.Martin – Joseph Martin (fl. 1788–1826)
 J.Ott – Jonathan Ott (born 1949)
 Jovet – Paul Albert Jovet (1896–1991)
 Jovet-Ast – Suzanne Jovet-Ast (1914–2006)
 Joy Thomps. – Joy Thompson (1923–2018)
 J.Palmer – Joanne Palmer (born 1960)
 J.P.Anderson – Jacob Peter Anderson (1874–1953)
 J.Parn. – John Adrian Naicker Parnell (born 1954)
 J.Pfeiff. – Johan Philip Pfeiffer (1888–1947)
 J.-P.Frahm – Jan-Peter Frahm (1945–2014)
 J.P.Nelson – Jane P. Nelson (fl. 1980)
 J.Poiss. – Jules Poisson (1833–1919)
 J.P.Pigott – Julian Patrick Pigott (fl. 2001)
 J.Prado – Jefferson Prado (born 1964)
 J.Presl – Jan Svatopluk Presl (1791–1849)
 J.P.Yue – Ji-pei Yue (fl. 2004) 
 J.Raynal – Jean Raynal (1933–1979)
 J.R.Clarkson – John Richard Clarkson (born 1950)
 J.Rémy – Ezechiel Jules Rémy (1826–1893)
 J.R.Forst. – Johann Reinhold Forster (1729–1798)
 J.R.I.Wood – John Richard Ironside Wood (born 1944)
 J.R.Lee – John Ramsay Lee (1868–1959)
 J.R.Rohrer – Joseph Raphael Rohrer (born 1954)
 J.Roth – Johannes Rudolph Roth (1815–1858)
 J.Rousseau – Joseph Jules Jean Jacques Rousseau (1905–1970)
 J.Roux – Jean Roux (1876–1939)
 J.R.Perkins – John Russell Perkins (born 1868)
 J.R.Rolfe – Jeremy Richard Rolfe (fl. 2013)
 J.R.Wheeler – Judith Roderick Wheeler (born 1944)
 J.Scheff. – Jozef Scheffer (1903–1949)
 J.Scheuchzer – Johannes Gaspar Scheuchzer (1684–1738)
 J.Schiller – Josef Schiller (1877–1960)
 J.Schneid. – Josef Schneider (died 1885)
 J.Schröt. – Joseph Schröter (1837–1894)
 J.Schultze-Motel – Jürgen Schultze-Motel (born 1930)
 J.Schust. – Julius Schuster (1886–1949)
 J.Scott – John Scott (1838–1880)
 J.Scriba – Julius Karl Scriba (1848–1905)
 J.Steiner – Julius Steiner (1844–1918)
 J.Sinclair – James Sinclair (1913–1968)
 J.Sm. – John Smith (1798–1888)
 J.S.Martin – James Stillman Martin (1914–2000)
 J.S.Mill. – James Spencer Miller (born 1953)
 J.S.Muell. – John Miller (1715–c.1792) aka Johann Sebastian Mueller
 J.Soulié – Jean André Soulié (1858–1905)
 J.S.Pringle – James Scott Pringle (born 1937)
 J.Stewart – Joyce Stewart (1936–2011)
 J.St.-Hil. – Jean Henri Jaume Saint-Hilaire (1772–1845)
 J.Stirl. – James Stirling (1852–1909) 
 J.T.Baldwin – John Thomas Baldwin (1910–1974) 
 J.T.Curtis – John Thomas Curtis (1913–1961)
 J.T.Johanss. – Jan Thomas Johansson  (fl. 1987-94)
 J.T.Howell – John Thomas Howell (1903–1994)
 J.T.Hunter – John T. Hunter (fl. 1967)
 J.T.Palmer – James Terence Palmer (born 1923)
 J.T.Pan – Jin Tang Pan (born 1935)
 J.T.Pereira – Joan T. Pereira (fl. 1994)
 J.T.Quekett – John Thomas Quekett (1815–1861) (brother of Edwin John Quekett)
 J.T.Wall – J. T. Wall (fl. 1934)
 J.T.Waterh. –  (1924–1983)
 J.T.Williams – John Trevor Williams (1938-2015)
 Judd – Walter Stephen Judd (born 1951)
 Jum. – Henri Lucien Jumelle (1866–1935)
 Jungh. – (Friedrich) Franz Wilhelm Junghuhn (1809–1864)
 Junius – Hadrianus Junius (1511–1575)
 Juss. – Antoine Laurent de Jussieu (1748–1836)
 Juswara – Lina Susanti Juswara (born 1971)
 Juz. – Sergei Vasilievich Juzepczuk (1893–1959)
 J.V.Lamour. – Jean Vincent Félix Lamouroux (1779–1825)
 J.V.Schneid. – Julio Valentin Schneider (born 1967)
 J.V.Stone – Judi V. Stone (born 1946)
 J.V.Thomps. – John Vaughan Thompson (1779–1847)
 J.Wallis – John Wallis (1714–1793)
 J.W.Baker – Jason W. Baker (born 1981)
 J.W.Benn. – John Whitchurch Bennett (fl. 1842)
 J.W.Cribb – Joan Winifred Cribb (born 1949)
 J.W.Dawson – John Wyndham Dawson (1928–2019)
 J.Wen – Jun Wen (born 1963)
 J.West – James West (1886–1939)
 J.W.Green – John William Green (born 1930)
 J.W.Grimes – James Walter Grimes (born 1953)
 J.W.Horn – James W. Horn (fl. 2009)
 J.White R.N. – John White (1757–1832)
 J.W.Ingram – John William Ingram (born 1924)
 J.W.Mast. – John William Masters (1792–1873)
 J.W.Moore – John William Moore (1901–1990) (not to be confused with the American politician of the same name)
 J.Woods – Joseph Woods Jr. (1776–1864)
 J.W.Powell – John Wesley Powell (1834–1902)
 J.W.Robbins – James Watson Robbins (1801–1879)
 J.W.Sturm – Johann Wilhelm Sturm (1808–1865)
 J.W.Thomson – John Walter Thomson (1913–2009)
 J.W.Weinm. – Johann Wilhelm Weinmann (1683–1741)
 J.W.White – James Walter White (1846–1932)
 J.W.Zetterst. – Johan Wilhelm Zetterstedt (1785–1874)
 J.W.Zhai – Jun Wen Zhai (born 1985)
 J.Zahlbr. –  (1782–1851)
 J.Z.Weber – Joseph Zvonko Weber (1930–1996)

K–Z 

To find entries for K–Z, use the table of contents above.

 

1